Albinaria sphakiota is a species of air-breathing land snail, a terrestrial pulmonate gastropod mollusk in the family Clausiliidae, the door snails. The species is endemic to Crete.

Distribution
This species occurs in Greece. It is known from steep gorges in Sfakia, western Crete: Imbros Gorge, Aradena Gorge and Asfendou Gorge.

See also
Albinaria sphakiota
List of non-marine molluscs of Greece

References

Albinaria
Gastropods described in 1887
Endemic fauna of Crete
Molluscs of Europe